The 2019–20 FA Youth Cup was the 68th edition of the FA Youth Cup. The defending champions were Liverpool. Manchester City won the final 3–2 against Chelsea. This was their third time winning the tournament.

Preliminary round

First round qualifying

Second round qualifying

Third round qualifying

First round 
41 ties was meant to be played, but the Bolton Wanderers would get a bye to the next round, while Dulwich Hamlet FC received a walkover as Crawley Town withdrew from the competition.

Second round

Third round

Fourth round

Fifth round

Quarter finals

Semi finals

Final 

 

 
 
|-
|colspan=4|Substitutes:
|-
 
 
 
 

 

|-
|colspan=4|Coach:  Carlos Vicens
|-

 
 

 

 
 

|-
|colspan=4|Substitutes:
|-

 
 

|-
|colspan=4|Coach:  Ed Brand
|-

See also 

 2019–20 FA Cup

References

External links 

 The FA Youth Cup at The Football Association official website

FA Youth Cup seasons